Béatrice Lalinon Gbado is a children's writer from Benin.

She has written 31 children's books published by EDICEF, an imprint of the French publisher Hachette, and by her own publishing house Ruisseaux d'Afrique based in Cotonou. She is married and has four children.

Publication
 Les fruits
 Les animaux domestiques
 Les légumes et condiments
 Les formes et les couleurs
 Nos instruments de musique
 Fleurs et papillons
 Les maisons de chez nous
 La cuisine de grand-mère
 La mère et l'enfant
 Ganvié
 Danse mon petit, danse
 Bovi, le petit cabri
 Bovi et le miroir
 Bovi sait compter
 Toutou et le sachet
 Kouaba, le village en sursis
 Le rêve de Siba
 Kaïvi, l’enfant placée
 La petite carpe dorée
 Le planteur et la bague
 Course à pirogue
 Kouaba, le village en sursis
 Le rêve de Siba
 Kaïvi, l’enfant placée
 La petite carpe dorée
 Le planteur et la bague
 Course à pirogue
 Le rat et le serpent
 Chevaux fabuleux
 La gifle
 Le nénuphar de Bola
 Mémé
 Hêdomey
 En marche vers la liberté  Tomes1 et 2
 La belle Dêbo
 Les aventures de Biki

English translations
 Beautiful Debo: a story from Benin Translator Ponce E. Kokou Zannou, Africa Christian Press, 2001,

References

Beninese women writers
Beninese women children's writers
20th-century women writers
20th-century Beninese writers
1984 births
Living people